Our Dancing Daughters is a 1928 American silent drama film starring Joan Crawford and John Mack Brown about the "loosening of youth morals" that took place during the 1920s. The film was directed by Harry Beaumont and produced by Hunt Stromberg. Whilst the film has no audible dialog, it was released with a synchronized soundtrack and sound effects.

The film launched the career of Joan Crawford.

Plot
"Dangerous Diana" Medford (Crawford) is outwardly flamboyant and popular but inwardly virtuous and idealistic, patronizing her parents by telling them not to stay out late. Her friend Ann chases boys for their money and is as amoral as her mother.

Diana and Ann are both attracted to Ben Blaine (Brown). He takes Diana's flirtatious behavior with other boys as a sign of lack of interest in him and marries Ann, who has lied about her virtues. Bea, a mutual friend of Diana and Ann, also meets and marries a wealthy suitor named Norman who loves her but is haunted by her past.

Diana becomes distraught for a while about the marriages of her friends with questionable pasts. She decides to go away and Bea throws a raucous bon voyage party at the yacht club (complete with sculpted ice ocean liner centerpiece), which Ben declined to attend and made Ann decline as well. The same evening Ann hopes to meet up with her lover, Freddie, telling her husband she is going to see her sick mom. When her mom calls and Ben realizes Ann has lied to him yet again, they get into an argument and Ann storms out to meet Freddie.

Now alone, Ben decides to stop by the party where he and Diana realize their love for each other. Meanwhile, a drunken Ann follows Freddie into the party only to find Ben and Diana alone together in a quiet room. She causes an uproar, after which both Diana and Ben leave the party declaring their love but ultimately saying goodbye to one another.

Norman arrives at the dwindling party to find Bea trying to help the inebriated Ann home. On her way out, Ann mocks a trio of cleaning women and reflects on her and her mother's gold-digging strategy. Distracted by this, she stumbles and falls down a flight of stairs to her death.  Headlines tell of Diana's return home after two years away, upon which she and Ben are happily reunited.

Cast
 Joan Crawford as Diana "Di" Medford aka Diana the Dangerous
 John Mack Brown as Ben Blaine
 Nils Asther as Norman
 Dorothy Sebastian as Beatrice "Bea"
 Anita Page as Ann "Annikins"
 Kathlyn Williams as Ann's mother
 Edward J. Nugent as Freddie 
 Dorothy Cumming as Diana's mother
 Huntley Gordon as Diana's father
 Evelyn Hall as Freddie's mother
 Sam De Grasse as Freddie's father

Production
Joan Crawford stripped naked in front of the producer in order to get the lead role in this film. When the decision maker told Joan that the director was in charge of casting, Joan went to his office, repeated her performance, and got the part.

Reception
Bland Johnson in the New York Mirror commented, "Joan Crawford...does the greatest work of her career." The film was also nominated for two Academy Awards for Best Screenplay (Josephine Lovett) and Best Cinematography (George Barnes).

Box office
According to MGM records the film earned $757,000 in the US and Canada and $342,000 elsewhere resulting in a profit of $304,000.

Cultural impact
It was due in part to her role as the ferociously free Charleston-dancing, Prohibition-era-booze-swilling, stage-diving "Dangerous" Diana Medford that F. Scott Fitzgerald wrote of Joan Crawford:

Home media
The film was released in 2010 on DVD, and on blu-ray in January 2022.

References

External links
 
 
 Our Dancing Daughters at Turner Classic Movies
 
 

1928 films
American romantic drama films
American silent feature films
American black-and-white films
1920s English-language films
Films directed by Harry Beaumont
Metro-Goldwyn-Mayer films
Transitional sound films
Surviving American silent films
1928 romantic drama films
1920s American films
Silent romantic drama films
Silent American drama films